Shikrapur is a panchayat village in the state of Maharashtra, India.  It is the largest village in the Shirur Taluka of Pune District in Maharashtra.

Geography 
The village of Shikrapur lies at the junction of NH548D and NH753F.

Demographics 
According to the 2011 census, the village of Shikrapur had a population of 19,374, with 10,259 males (53.1%) and 9,115 females (46.9%): a gender ratio of 882 females per thousand males. With Population Density 1202 people per km², it can be classified as Census Town.

Economy 
The area around Shikrapur is irrigated by canals and the Velu River, and is used for growing vegetables, sugarcane, and other crops. Sugarcane is supplied mainly to a sugar mill 5 km from Shikrapur and 30 km from Hadapser. The village holds a weekly open air market on Sunday.

More than 200 large- and small-scale industries are located in Shikrapur, some of these manufacturers like John Deere, Alicon, Trinity.

Transportation

Highways 
Shikrapur lies at the junction of the Nagar road, also called NH753F (Pune-Ahmednagar-Aurangabad-Jalgoan Highway), and the Shikrapur-Chakan road, also called NH548D (Talegoan Dabhade-Chakan-Shikrapur-Ahmedpur in latur). The highways to Pune have heavy traffic due to extensive growth in the Maharashtra Industrial Development Corporation (MIDC) area in Ranjangaon and part of Sanaswadi.

Buses 
Maharashtra State Road Transport Corporation runs frequent bus service that stops at the city.

Pune Mahanagar Parivahan Mahamandal Limited (PMPML) also operates buses connecting Shikrapur to Pune, Pimpri-Chinchwad, and other cities. Students, commuters, and other users reach Pune on PMPML Bus No. 159 (Pune MaNaPa to Talegoan Dhamdhere bazar) and PMPML Bus No. 159P (Wagholi to Karegaon- Ranjangaon).

Proposed railway project
The Pune Metropolitan Region Development Authority (PMRDA) has proposed a railway ring project to connect business hubs in Talegaon Dabhade, Chakan, Shikrapur, and Uruli Kanchan; Sambhaji International Airport at Purandar; and Pune Railway station. The proposed route begins in Talegaon Dabhade, linking the Pune-Miraj and Pune-Nashik rail routes, and would also connect with Metro rail.

PMRDA-contracted Larsen & Toubro created a common minimum programme (CMP) to coordinate a geographical spread of 20 sq. km. The CMP includes Pune Municipal Corporation (PMC), Pimpri Chinchwad Municipal Corporation (PCMC), Pune Cantonment Board, Dehu Cantonment Board (DCB) and Khadki Cantonment Board (KCB) and Pune District.

Proposed Wagholi-Shikrapur bypass
The Pune Metropolitan Region Development Authority (PMRDA) and the district administration had planned 6-laninng and forming new bypass to mitigate frequent traffic congestion on the stretch connecting Pune, Wagholi and Shikrapur.

The government has approved ₹6.5 billion for the plan, and it is also part of the union government’s Bharatmala project, which allocates ₹12.6 billion for road improvement. However, the project has been pending for many years.

Educational institutions

Council for the Indian School Certificate Examinations | ICSE-affiliated schools
 Kasturi Educational Campus | Pratima Palande Memorial School, Shikrapur

CBSE-affiliated schools

 Jawahar Navodaya Vidyalay, Pimple Jagtap
 Amrutwel Global School
 Takshashila Gurukul Public School
 C.S. Bhujbal Global School
 Shree Sidhivinayak School
Jaywant Public School, Sanaswadi

Children's schools
 ZPPS 24 Mail, Shikrapur
 Holy Spirit English Medium School, Talegoan Rd, Shikrapur
 Lexicon Kids School
 Gurukul International
 Podar Jumbo Kids School, Chakan -Shikrapur Road, Shikrapur

Maharashtra Board-affiliated schools and junior colleges
 ZPPS ,Shikrapur
 ZPPS 24 Mail, Shikrapur
 Vidyadham Secondary School
 Vidyadham Prasahala Science, Art & Commerce, Shikrapur
 Ajinkyatara English medium School
Jawahar Navoday Vidyalay, Karandi
 Jaywant Public School, Sanaswadi

Colleges

 Kasturi Educational Campus | College of Polytechnic
 Kasturi Educational Campus | College of Pharmacy
 Kasturi Educational Campus | College of B.Ed
 Institute of Knowledge | College of Engineering
 Micro-Tech Institute of Technology

Notes

External links 
 
 

Villages in Pune district